Ashley Grace Twichell (born June 16, 1989) is an American competition swimmer who specializes in long-distance freestyle and open-water events. She placed seventh in the 10 kilometer open water swim at the 2020 Summer Olympics. Twichell's age at her Olympic Games debut, 32 years of age, made her the oldest American swimmer first-timer at an Olympic Games since 1908.

Career

2011
Twichell earned the first international medals of her career at the 2011 World Aquatics Championships in Shanghai, China, winning gold in the 5 km team and bronze in the 5 km open water events. Later in 2011, she earned a silver medal in the 800-meter freestyle at the 2011 Pan American Games.

2012
At the 2012 U.S. Olympic Trials, she placed 10th in the 800-meter freestyle and 18th in the 400-meter freestyle, missing the Olympic team.

2013
In 2013, Twichell won gold in the 10 km open water event at the 2013 Summer Universiade in Kazan, Russia.

2016 World Swimming Championships
Twichell competed at the 2016 World Swimming Championships held in Windsor, Canada in December 2016. She won the silver medal in the 800-meter freestyle with a time of 8:11.95, finishing only behind Leah Smith.

2017 World Aquatics Championships
At the 2017 World Aquatics Championships in July 2017 in Budapest, Hungary Twichell won two medals. The first medal she won was a gold medal with a time of 59:07.0 in the women's 5 kilometer open water swim. With her win, Twichell became the oldest American swimmer to win a world title in open water swimming as well as the oldest female swimmer for the United States since 2003 to win an international swimming title in an individual event. The day after winning a gold medal in an individual event, Twichell won a silver medal in the 5 kilometer mixed team relay event.

2019 World Aquatics Championships
In July 2019 at the 2019 World Aquatics Championships in Gwangju, South Korea, Twichell qualified for her first Olympic Games. Her sixth place finish in the 10 kilometer open water swim secured her spot on the U.S. Olympic Team in the marathon 10 kilometer swim for the 2020 Summer Olympics. Twichell and her teammate Haley Anderson, who also competed in the race and finished in the top ten, were the first athletes qualifying to represent the United States at the 2020 Summer Olympics in any sport. Twichell and her three relay teammates, Jordan Wilimovsky, Haley Anderson, and Michael Brinegar, won bronze in the 5 kilometer mixed team relay event.

2020
After months of pool closures and a lack of swim meets to compete in due to the COVID-19 pandemic, Twichell returned to racing in the pool in November 2020 at the 2020 U.S. Open Swimming Championships. At the Championships, she won a silver medal in the 1500-meter freestyle with a time of 16:18.11, finishing less than fourteen seconds behind gold medalist Bella Sims.

2021

2021 US Open Water National Championships
In April 2021, Twichell competed in the 5 kilometer and 10 kilometer open water swims at the 2021 US Open Water National Championships in Fort Myers Beach, Florida. She finished second with a time of 2:03:01 in the women's 10 kilometer open water swim. In the women's 5 kilometer open water swim, Twichell finished first with a time of 1:01:31, winning the national title in the event.

2020 US Olympic Trials
At the 2020 USA Swimming Olympic Trials (held in June 2021 due to the COVID-19 pandemic) Twichell competed in two individual events, the 400-meter freestyle and the 1500-meter freestyle. In the 400-meter freestyle Twichell placed eighth with a time of 4:10.51 in the prelims heats and decided not to swim in the final even though she qualified. In the 1500-meter freestyle she finished fifth in the final with a time of 16:01.62, not qualifying to swim the event at the 2020 Summer Olympics.

2020 Summer Olympics

Twichell was 32 years old heading into the 2020 Summer Olympics in Tokyo, making her the oldest first-time American swimmer at an Olympic Games in over 100 years. Specifically, she was the oldest American swimmer at Olympic debut since James Green debuted at age 32 in 1908. In the swimming community, only one female U.S. swimmer at the Olympic Games had been older, Dara Torres who was 41 years old at the 2008 Summer Olympics.

In the 10 kilometer marathon swim on August 4, Twichell placed seventh behind sixth place finisher and American teammate Haley Anderson with a time of 1:59:37.9.

Awards and honors
 2019 Fayetteville-Manlius Hornets Hall of Fame inductee

Personal
Twichell is married to Derek Wall and in November 2021 she announced they were pregnant with their first child.

See also
List of Duke University people

References

External links
 
 
 Ashley Twichell – Duke University athlete profile at Goduke.com
 

1989 births
Living people
American female freestyle swimmers
People from Westchester County, New York
Sportspeople from New York (state)
World Aquatics Championships medalists in open water swimming
Swimmers at the 2011 Pan American Games
Medalists at the FINA World Swimming Championships (25 m)
Pan American Games silver medalists for the United States
Pan American Games medalists in swimming
Universiade medalists in swimming
Universiade gold medalists for the United States
Female long-distance swimmers
Medalists at the 2013 Summer Universiade
Medalists at the 2011 Pan American Games
Duke Blue Devils women's swimmers
Fayetteville-Manlius High School alumni